HSG Bad Wildungen is a German women's handball club from Bad Wildungen, competing in the Frauen Handball-Bundesliga.

Kits

Team

Current squad
Squad for the 2022-23 season

Goalkeepers
 1  Larissa Schutrups
 12  Manuela Brütsch
Wings
RW
 4  Maren Gajewski
 44  Maksi Pallas
LW
 14  Thea Øby-Olsen
 28  Julia Symanzik
Pivots
 2  Annika Ingenpaß 
 45  Jolina Huhnstock

Back players
LB
 23  Marieke Blase
 32  Verena Oßwald
CB
 9  Emma Ruwe
 10  Anika Hampel
RB
 6  Anouk Nieuwenweg 
 22  Jana Scheib
 59  Lisa-Marie Preis

Transfers
Transfers for the 2023–24 season 

Joining

Leaving

References

External links
HSG Bad Wildungen official website

German handball clubs
Handball clubs established in 1923
1923 establishments in Germany
Sport in Hesse